Rachel Constantine (born 1975) is a Philadelphia-based realist / impressionist painter.

Her work has been exhibited in the Philadelphia Museum of Art, the Pennsylvania Academy of the Fine Arts Museum, the Philadelphia Sketch Club, and the Woodmere Art Museum in Chestnut Hill, PA.  Her painting "Self Portrait with a Man" was purchased by The Pennsylvania Academy of the Fine Arts for their permanent collection.

In 2006, Constantine was invited to exhibit in Artworks Gallery at the Philadelphia Museum of Art as the local complement to the Museum's exhibition: Wyeth: Memory and Magic. Her work can be found in The Vivian O. and Meyer P. Potamkin Collection in the Pennsylvania Academy of the Fine Arts, and is featured in the book Alla Prima: A Contemporary Guide to Traditional Direct Painting written by Al Gury, the chairman of the Pennsylvania Academy's painting department.

Works
In her Monument (2006), Constantine explores themes that are at once personal and timeless. The composition alludes both to the symbolic nature morte of the Baroque era and to the still lifes of Chardin. Her own sensibility adds poetry as well as an edge of modern anxiety and sadness.

In her Swan Pond (2002), the amount of thinner, oil, and so forth added to the paint has a profound effect on the quality of the brush calligraphy and the details in a painting. Broad, scumbled masses provide the setting for paint that has varying degrees of oil added to it. The gazebo, water reflection, and swans achieve their clarity because they are rendered with brushstrokes that are more thickly loaded with paint and also because that paint has a small amount of oil added. This follows the "lean to fat" concept of layering. The "fatter" final, detail touches sit on top with clarity due to the added oil, which created a sharper edge over the less oily paint beneath.

Beyond the Surface
Constantine made her curatorial debut at the Principle Gallery in Alexandria, Virginia, with Beyond the Surface, a group show featuring work from realist artist who include conceptual elements in their work along with their high levels of technical mastery. Artists chosen by Constantine include Daniel Sprick, Mario Robinson, Charles Morris, Rose Frantzen, Stephen Layne, Amy Kann, Renee Foulks, Stephen Early, and Stephen Cefalo.

Interview
Constantine's projects are typically sparked by a particular quality that she observes in someone that she feels compelled to try to capture and translate visually. She almost always paints people she knows because she prefers to have that emotional connection going in. Constantine says, "my paintings don't necessarily aim to be "about" the person I'm working with; it's the characteristics of the individual that I try to use as a vehicle to express larger concepts. Typically, I'll bring subject into my studio, try my best to get them to relax and not "model," and then photograph them in an attempt to achieve a specific pose that speaks to me. I try to have as few preconceptions as possible at this point, because my whole goal is to capture a "found moment." Once the pose is set, I bring the model back for sittings, as needed."

Constantine thinks that classical painting is all about light; she finds in her own work that a piece's success often rises and falls according to the accuracy of its depiction. she says, "in learning to paint light, one learns to capture emotion. That's why I rarely use artificial light sources; there's a limitlessness about the color and range of natural light that artificial light just can't reproduce. To my thinking, color in and of itself does not make art. There's form, function and foundation there, it's one thing to say something's beautiful- because there's beauty in almost everything, if you take the time to stop and really look hard  enough- but it's another to call it a work of art. So I tend to admire painters who are strong draftsmen first."

References

1973 births
Living people
American women painters
21st-century American painters
Pennsylvania Academy of the Fine Arts alumni
University of the Arts (Philadelphia) alumni
21st-century American women artists